Edgar J. Malepeai (born August 7, 1950) is a Democratic politician from Pocatello, Idaho. He served as an Idaho State Senator from the Bannock County-based District 30 from 2002 to 2012. During his final two years in the Idaho Senate Malepeai served as minority leader.

Malepeai was born in American Samoa and graduated from high school in South San Francisco, California. He moved to Pocatello in the 1970s to attend Idaho State University, where he played football and rugby. After graduation, Malepeai worked as a government teacher at Highland High School. Malepeai also works as a football official in Big Sky Conference games.

Malepeai previously served on the Pocatello City Council and as chair of the Bannock County Democratic Party. He was first elected to the Idaho Senate in 2002 with 64.6 percent of the vote. He ran unopposed for reelection in 2004, 2006 and 2008. Malepeai also has previous service representing Idaho on the Democratic National Committee.

Malepeai missed the 2007 and 2008 legislative sessions while caring for his wife, Brenda, who suffered from a rare form of cancer. Brenda Malepeai died in March 2009.

In 2010 Malepeai faced Republican opposition for the first time since his initial state senate run eight years earlier. Malepeai was reelected to a fifth term with 54.6 percent of the vote. Malepeai was not a candidate for reelection in 2012.

References

External links

Idaho Legislature - Senator Edgar J. Malepeai official government website
Project Vote Smart - Senator Edgar J. Malepeai (ID) profile
Follow the Money - Edgar J. Malepeai
2008 2006 2004 2002 campaign contributions

1950 births
Living people
American people of Samoan descent
American Samoan politicians
College football officials
Idaho city council members
Idaho State Bengals football players
Democratic Party Idaho state senators
People from Pocatello, Idaho
People from South San Francisco, California